Sulpicius Victor was a Latin rhetor who lived in the 4th century AD. He wrote Institutiones oratoriae, dedicated to his son-in-law. The only manuscript of this work has been lost and the editio princeps, which is the only reliable source, was printed in 1521. A new critical edition was issued in 2018, replacing Halm's one.

References

Bibliography
Rainer Jakoby, Institutiones oratoriae, De Gruyter, 2018.

External links
Rhetores Latini minores, Carolus Halm (ed.), Lipsiae in aedibus B. G. Teubneri, 1863, pp. 311-352.

Ancient Roman rhetoricians
4th-century people